Light of the Fearless is the fifth studio album by British electronic dance music group Hybrid, released on 27 July 2018 by Distinctive Records. It is Hybrid's first album without keyboardist Chris Healings, following his departure from the band in 2015.

Its lead single, "Light Up", was released on 13 July 2018 alongside remixes from Loadstar and Matt Lange.

The second single from the album, "Hold Your Breath", was released on 21 February 2019, accompanied by a short film which stars Altered Carbon'''s James Purefoy and band members Mike and Charlotte.

BackgroundLight of the Fearless was made in conjunction with various movies that Hybrid was scoring, such as Vice, Billionaire Ransom and Interlude in Prague''. The album was made with the help of the City of Prague Philharmonic Orchestra.

The inspiration for the album spawned from events in the lives of Mike and Charlotte Truman, such as the death of Charlotte's mother in 2012, along with protests such as the March for Our Lives 2018 and 2017 Women's March, although the album is not political. The album also features a cover of Tom Petty's song "I Won't Back Down".

Track listing

Charts

References

External links
Official Hybrid website
Distinctive Records website
Light of the Fearless on Discogs
Hold your breath short film
Hold your breath premiere - article on MusicNews.com

2018 albums
Hybrid (British band) albums
Distinct'ive Records albums